Dongo Kundu Bypass Highway, also Mombasa Southern Bypass Highway  ,  is a road under construction in Kenya. When completed, it will connect Mombasa Mainland West to Mombasa Mainland South, without entering Mombasa Island.

Location
From there it loops around the western edge of Moi International Airport and ends at a neighborhood called Mwache at the water's edge, west of the airport. From Mwache, several bridges carry the highway across the  Port Reitz Bay to Dongo Kundu on the south-side of the bay. From Dongo Kundu the highway continues in a southeasterly direction until it ends at Ng’ombeni, on the Malindi–Bagamoyo Highway.

Overview
This road is an important transport corridor for traffic destined to and from Tanzania and that to and from the interior of Kenya and beyond. This will ease traffic pressure on the Likoni Ferry. The bypass will decongest Mombasa Island. Four bridges will be built in the swamps and across the open ocean water, as part of the highway. Other road improvements in addition to the highway include a  dual carriageway between Miritini and Kipevu, a road measuring  connecting Moi International Airport to the bypass which passes west of the airport and clover-leaf interchanges at Miritini and Kipevu. A free trade zone, the Dongo Kundu Free Trade Zone, with 6,200 sites and ability to accommodate more than 10,000 business units is part of the planned development. Kenya National Highway Authority is the developer of the project.

Funding
The construction contract was awarded to China Civil Engineering Construction Corporation. The three phase project is budgeted at KSh25 billion (approx. US$251 million). The first phase of construction was the Miritini to Kipevu section, budgeted at KSh11 billion (approx. US$110.31 million), borrowed from the Japan International Cooperation Agency.
Note: US$1.00 = KSh99.72 on 2 April 2016

Construction
The first phase of this three-phase project was completed and commissioned in June 2018. Phase II and III of the development are expected to follow. As of November 2020, phases II and III were ongoing, with completion anticipated in 2024.

See also
 List of roads in Kenya

References

External links
 Video of Planned Construction of Dongo Kundu Bypass Highway

Japan International Cooperation Agency
Streets in Mombasa
Roads in Kenya
Geography of Kenya
Transport in Kenya
Transport infrastructure completed in 2018
2018 establishments in Kenya